The 1917 Texas A&M Aggies football team represented Texas A&M during the 1917 college football season. The team was unscored upon and was the 1917 Southwest Conference champion.

Schedule

References

Texas AandM
Texas A&M Aggies football seasons
Southwest Conference football champion seasons
College football undefeated seasons
Texas AandM football